The 1971/72 NTFL season was the 51st season of the Northern Territory Football League (NTFL).

St Marys have won their eighth premiership title while defeating the Darwin in the grand final by one point.

Grand Final

References

Northern Territory Football League seasons
NTFL